Propionibacterium acidifaciens  is a Gram-positive, anaerobic and pleomorphic bacterium from the genus of Propionibacterium which has been isolated from a human oral cavity in London in England.

References 

Propionibacteriales
Bacteria described in 2009